Chen Xiaodong (born January 11, 1988, in Shanghai) is a Chinese sabre fencer. She won a gold medal, as a member of the host nation's fencing team, in the same weapon at the 2010 Asian Games in Guangzhou.

Chen represented China at the 2012 Summer Olympics in London, where she competed in the women's individual sabre event, along with her teammate Zhu Min. She defeated Tunisia's Amira Ben Chaabane in the first preliminary round, before losing her next match to Italy's Irene Vecchi, with a final score of 10–15.

References

External links
Profile – FIE
NBC Olympics Profile

1988 births
Living people
Chinese female fencers
Olympic fencers of China
Fencers at the 2012 Summer Olympics
Asian Games medalists in fencing
Fencers from Shanghai
Fencers at the 2010 Asian Games
Asian Games gold medalists for China
Medalists at the 2010 Asian Games
Universiade medalists in fencing
Universiade gold medalists for China
Medalists at the 2011 Summer Universiade
21st-century Chinese women